Qingdao No. 9 High school (also called Qingdao Foreign Language School) was established by Richard Wilhelm on 1900. The school is located in the Qingdao city of China.

The school was moved from Qingdao Shanghai Road to Qingdao Qixinghe road in 2016. The new place is next to the Mount Longdou, and a half of the mountain belongs to the school.

High schools in Shandong
Education in Qingdao